The 1992–93 Illinois State Redbirds men's basketball team represented Illinois State University during the 1992–93 NCAA Division I men's basketball season. The Redbirds, led by fourth year head coach Bob Bender, played their home games at Redbird Arena and competed as a member of the Missouri Valley Conference.

They finished the season 19–10, 13–5 in conference play to finish in first place. They were the number one seed for the Missouri Valley Conference tournament. They were victorious over Indiana State University in their quarterfinal game and Drake University in their semifinal game, but were defeated by Southern Illinois University in their final game.

Roster

Schedule

|-
!colspan=9 style=|Regular Season

|-
!colspan=9 style=|Diet PepsiMissouri Valley Conference {MVC} tournament

References

Illinois State Redbirds men's basketball seasons
Illinois State
Illinois State Men's Basketball
Illinois State Men's Basketball